Smerinthus szechuanus, the Sichuan eyed hawkmoth, is a moth of the family Sphingidae. It was described by Benjamin Preston Clark in 1938. It is known from Hubei, Sichuan, Yunnan and Hunan in China.

References

Smerinthus
Moths described in 1938